Ohio Dominican University is a private Dominican liberal arts university in Columbus, Ohio. The university has approximately 1,700 students and offers undergraduate degrees in 40 majors as well as nine graduate degree programs.

History 

The College of St. Mary of the Springs was chartered in 1911 as an all-women's school. It became coeducational in 1964 and changed its name to Ohio Dominican College four years later. In 2002, its name changed to Ohio Dominican University.

Academics 
Ohio Dominican offers 40 undergraduate degree programs.

The Charles School 
The Charles School at Ohio Dominican University opened in 2007 with the goal to significantly improve college success for young people in Central Ohio. The public charter high school is part of a nationwide network of Early College High Schools initiated through funds from the Bill and Melinda Gates Foundation and other organizations. The Charles School (TCS) is open to all Ohio students entering the 9th grade, with a target population of students who have a desire to go to college and would be the first in their family to do so. Students have the opportunity to graduate with a high school diploma and up to 62 hours of college credit and/or an associate degree, at no cost to the student.

Athletics 

The Ohio Dominican teams, nicknamed the Panthers, compete in the NCAA Division II as members of the Great Midwest Athletic Conference (GMAC). ODU joined the GMAC on July 1, 2017. Ohio Dominican originally joined the Great Lakes Intercollegiate Athletic Conference in 2010 as part of the transition to NCAA Division II from the National Association of Intercollegiate Athletics (NAIA). The university currently offers 16 varsity sports including: men's and women's basketball, baseball, cheerleading (Football, both men's and women's basketball), men's and women's cross country, football, men's and women's golf, men's and women's soccer, softball, men's and women's track and field (indoor and outdoor), and women's volleyball.

Notable alumni and faculty

Alumni 

 Jonathan Sánchez, Major League Baseball pitcher
 Anne O'Hare McCormick, News correspondent
 Aden Ibrahim Aw Hirsi, Former Governor of Gedo, Somalia
 Christian Nodal, Mexican singer and songwriter

Presidents

Gallery

References

External links 

ODU Athletics Website

 
Former women's universities and colleges in the United States
Universities and colleges in Columbus, Ohio
Educational institutions established in 1911
1911 establishments in Ohio
Catholic universities and colleges in Ohio
Association of Catholic Colleges and Universities
Roman Catholic Diocese of Columbus